Accra Lions Football Club is a professional sports club based in East Legon, Accra, Ghana. The club is competing in the Ghana Premier League, the top professional football division of the football league system in Ghana and in the Ghanaian FA Cup. They play their home matches at the Accra Sports Stadium. James Francis is the coach of the side.

History

Accra Lions Football Club was founded on 12 December 2015.

They secure promotion after just two seasons in the Greater Accra Division Two after winning the Zone IV division with a record 73 points in 28 matches to qualify for the middle league.

During the Greater Accra promotional playoffs at the Tema Sports Stadium, Accra Lions booked the sole qualification ticket with a 100% winning record. They beat Emmanuel FC (4-1), R-Stakes (3-0) and Photizo Future Professionals (2-0) to slot into Division One Zone III which includes clubs based in Greater Accra, Eastern Region and Volta Region.

On 28 January 2018, Accra Lions officially announced the Accra Sports Stadium as their new home ground for the 2017/2018 Division One League.

In 2018 they made their debut in the Ghana Division One- Zone Three and in the Ghanaian FA Cup.

After becoming champions in the Ghana Division One 2020/2021, Accra Lions earned promotion to the Ghana Premier League. They scored the most goals (57 goals in 28 matches) and the club's striker Rauf Salifu ended up as top scorer in this seasons Division One with 21 goals.

In the FIFA Global Transfer Report 2021, the Accra Lions ranked 7th in Africa ( CAF ) with 10 outgoing transfers. The following year they were also able to transfer 10 players abroad. 

In their second season in the Ghana Premier League, they played with the youngest team in the Premier League in a 1-0 away win against Tamale City, with an average age of 18.73 years they conquered second place in the table with 34 points after 20 games.

Staff 

Head coach
  James Francis

Sporting Director
  Ibrahim Tanko

General Manager
  Ishmael Hamidu

Director of Finance & Administration
  Enoch Kofi Osei

Goalkeeper's coach
  Osei Boateng

Physiotherapist
  Manaf Abubakar

U17 Head Coach
  Sam Gill

Assistant Academy Manager
  Fiete Kaupp

Current squad 
As of 1 March 2023

Former players
  Osman Bukari
  Jessie Guera Djou
  Nasiru Moro
  Olivier Boissy
  Rahim Ibrahim
  Joseph Amoah
  Jordan Ayimbila
  Evans Etti
  Rauf Salifu
  Alex Agyarkwa
  Rashid Abubakar
  Hagan Frimpong
  Jacob Mensah

Notes

External links 
 

Football clubs in Ghana
Football clubs in Accra
Association football clubs established in 2015
2015 establishments in Ghana